Iridomyrmex cephaloinclinus is a species of ant belonging to the genus Iridomyrmex. It was described by Shattuck in 1993, the species is abundant to several states in Australia.

References

External links

Iridomyrmex
Hymenoptera of Australia
Insects described in 1993